IAV may refer to:

 IAV GmbH, a German engineering company in the automotive industry
 Interim Armored Vehicle, a U.S. Army armored fighting vehicle acquisition program
 Influenza A virus, a virus causing influenza in birds and some mammals